The Westville School District is a community public school district that serves students in pre-kindergarten through sixth grade from Westville, in Gloucester County, New Jersey, United States.

As of the 2019–20 school year, the district, comprised of one school, had an enrollment of 361 students and 31.7 classroom teachers (on an FTE basis), for a student–teacher ratio of 11.4:1.

The district is classified by the New Jersey Department of Education as being in District Factor Group "B", the second lowest of eight groupings. District Factor Groups organize districts statewide to allow comparison by common socioeconomic characteristics of the local districts. From lowest socioeconomic status to highest, the categories are A, B, CD, DE, FG, GH, I and J.

For seventh through twelfth grade, public school students attend Gateway Regional High School, a regional public high school that also serves students from the boroughs of National Park, Wenonah and Woodbury Heights, as part of the Gateway Regional High School District. As of the 2019–20 school year, the high school had an enrollment of 900 students and 79.0 classroom teachers (on an FTE basis), for a student–teacher ratio of 11.4:1.

School
The district serves students in grades PreK-6 at Parkview Elementary School. The school served 359 students as of the 2019–20 school year.
Renee Egan, Principal

Administration
Core members of the district's administration are:
Dr. Shannon Whalen, Superintendent
Christopher Rodia, Business Administrator / Board Secretary

Board of education
The district's board of education, comprised of nine members, sets policy and oversees the fiscal and educational operation of the district through its administration. As a Type II school district, the board's trustees are elected directly by voters to serve three-year terms of office on a staggered basis, with three seats up for election each year held (since 2012) as part of the November general election. The board appoints a superintendent to oversee the day-to-day operation of the district.

References

External links
Westville School District

School Data for the Westville School District, National Center for Education Statistics
Gateway Regional High School

Westville, New Jersey
New Jersey District Factor Group B
School districts in Gloucester County, New Jersey
Public elementary schools in New Jersey